Hettie Jones (née  Cohen; born in 1934) is an American poet. She has written twenty-three books that include a memoir of the Beat Generation, three volumes of poetry, and publications for children and young adults, including The Trees Stand Shining and Big Star Fallin' Mama: Five Women in Black Music.

Early life 
Hettie Jones was born Hettie Cohen on June 15, 1934 in Brooklyn, New York, to a Jewish family. She was raised in Laurelton, Queens. She entered Mary Washington College in Virginia in 1952. She had not traveled far from her home until college, and had not experienced anti-semitism up until that time: "The roommates didn't want to live with me because I was a Jew."

Career 
After graduating from college and returning to New York, Jones married LeRoi Jones (later known as Amiri Baraka), an African-American writer. Her family initially disowned her for marrying a black man, but her husband's family was welcoming. Despite living in the diverse Lower East Side of Manhattan, they were sometimes harassed in public for being an interracial couple.

In 1957, the couple founded the literary magazine Yugen, and launched the publication house Totem Press. They published early works by Beat generation figures Allen Ginsberg, Jack Kerouac, Frank O'Hara, Joel Oppenheimer, and Charles Olson, all of whom they'd befriended as well.

By 1964, LeRoi had become active in the Black Arts movement and their marriage was deteriorating. While still married to Hettie, he fathered a daughter, Dominique di Prima, with poet Diane DiPrima. LeRoi divorced Hettie and moved to Harlem. She continued writing, editing, and teaching.

Jones published her memoir, How I Became Hettie Jones, in 1990. She detailed the experiences of growing up among a Jewish family and community, being part of the Beat Generation, her early writing, and the social difficulties of being in an interracial marriage and raising biracial children.

In 1999, Jones won the Poetry Society of America’s Norma Farber First Book Award for her first volume of poetry titled Drive (1998, Hanging Loose Press). According to Booklist, the publication of Drive is what established Jones as a “potent and fearless poet.” Jones also published two additional volumes of poetry titled All Told (2003) and Doing 70 (2007), both of which are available in print from Hanging Loose Press. Jones’ poetry focuses on topics related to everyday life, “whether presenting New York scenes with delightfully quirky insight, offering biting but brief political commentary, or lightly cloaking compact observations on the state of the world in simple words with sharp wit” (Booklist). Her poems are written in a self-narrative style that often display hope and positivity. She also explores themes of transportation and transformation that result in reflection and internal meditation. These themes are especially specific to the poems found in Drive and Doing 70.

Jones is a longtime editor and has taught poetry, fiction, and memoir at many universities, including Penn State University, NYU, the 92nd Street Y, University of Wyoming, and Parsons School of Design. Jones is a former chair of the PEN Prison Writing Committee, and from 1989 to 2002 she ran a writing workshop at the New York State Correctional Facility for Women at Bedford Hills, which included inmate Judy Clark as a student. This workshop hailed as inspiration for Jones’ nationally distributed collection, Aliens At The Border. Jones also co-authored a memoir for Rita Marley, widow of Bob Marley.
More recently, Jones has received grants to begin a writing program on Manhattan's Lower East Side at the Lower East Side Girls Club Center for Community. Her book, Love, H, a selection from 40 years of correspondence with the sculptor Helene Dorn, was published by Duke University Press in October 2016.

Personal life 
Jones has two daughters from her marriage to LeRoi Jones: Kellie Jones (born 1959) and Lisa Jones Brown (born 1961). They are educators and writers.

Jones still resides in the same East Village apartment at 27 Cooper Square that she and LeRoi moved into in 1962. She successfully spearheaded a campaign in 2005 to save her apartment building when it was to be demolished to build a hotel.

She continues to teach and write.

Works 

 How I became Hettie Jones: A Memoir
 Drive 
 Big Star Fallin’ Mama -- Five Women in Black Music
 No Woman No Cry
 All Told
 Doing 70

References

External links

Hettie Jones Website
New School MFA in Creative Writing
How I Became Hettie Jones
Hettie Jones - Grove Atlantic
Hettie Jones - Academy of American Poets
Hettie Jones - Goddard College
Interview with Hettie Jones by Stephen McKiernan, Binghamton University Libraries Center for the Study of the 1960s, July 6, 2009
Finding aid to Hettie Jones papers at Columbia University. Rare Book & Manuscript Library.

1934 births
Living people
Beat Generation poets
Jewish American writers
Jewish pacifists
People from Greenwich Village
People from Laurelton, Queens
20th-century American poets
American women poets
20th-century American memoirists
20th-century American women writers
American women memoirists
21st-century American Jews
21st-century American women